Ríkharður Hrafnkelsson (born 30 April 1957) is an Icelandic former basketball player and a former member of Icelandic national team. He won two national championships and three Icelandic Cups with Valur in the 1980's.

Early life
Ríkharður grew up in Stykkishólmur, Iceland. He played his first games with Snæfell at the age of 16 before moving to Reykjavík and joining Valur.

Icelandic national team
Ríkharður played 69 games for the Icelandic national team from 1976 to 1983.

Awards and accomplishments

Titles
Icelandic champion: 1980, 1983
Icelandic Cup (3): 1979, 1981, 1986
1. deild karla (1): 1990

Golf
Ríkharður was the chairman of the Golfklúbburinn Mostri in Stykkishólmur for 25 years.

References

External links
Úrvalsdeild statistics 1978-1991 at kki.is

1957 births
Living people
Rikhardur Hrafnkelsson
Rikhardur Hrafnkelsson
Rikhardur Hrafnkelsson
Rikhardur Hrafnkelsson